Andrea Schwartz (born June 12, 1977) is a former international butterfly and freestyle swimmer from Canada, who competed for her native country at the 1996 Summer Olympics in Atlanta, Georgia.  There she finished in 15th position in the 200-metre butterfly, and in 20th place in the 400-metre freestyle.  With the Canadian relay team, Schwartz reached the final in the 4x200-metre freestyle and ended up in fifth position, alongside Marianne Limpert, Shannon Shakespeare, and Jessica Deglau.

References

External links
Canadian Olympic Committee

1977 births
Living people
Canadian female butterfly swimmers
Canadian female freestyle swimmers
Olympic swimmers of Canada
Swimmers from Winnipeg
Swimmers at the 1996 Summer Olympics
Commonwealth Games medallists in swimming
Commonwealth Games bronze medallists for Canada
Swimmers at the 1998 Commonwealth Games
20th-century Canadian women
Medallists at the 1998 Commonwealth Games